Mikko Lampi (born 3 June 1952) is a Finnish former footballer.

Football career
He earned 16 caps at international level between 1979 and 1980.

At club level Lampi played for Ilves-Kissat, Ilves and Sepsi-78.

Personal
He is the father of the Finnish international footballer Veli Lampi.

References

1952 births
Finnish footballers
Finland international footballers
Living people
FC Ilves players
Sepsi-78 players
Association footballers not categorized by position